The Professorship of Medieval History is a professorship in medieval history at the University of Cambridge. It was founded on 1 May 1937.

The professorship is assigned to the Faculty of History.

List of Professors of Medieval History
The following have held the chair:

 1937–1942: Charles William Previté-Orton
 1944–1946: Zachary Nugent Brooke 
 1947–1954: David Knowles 
 1955–1972: Christopher Robert Cheney 
 1972–1978: Walter Ullmann 
 1978–1988: James Clarke Holt 
 1988–1999: Richard Barrie Dobson 
 1999–2016: Rosamond McKitterick 
 2016–present: John H. Arnold

References 

Medieval History
Medieval History, *, Cambridge
1937 establishments in England